Walter Clark may refer to:

 Walter Clark (Canadian politician) (1890–1987), Canadian politician, served in the Legislative Assembly of Manitoba
 Bill Clark (screenwriter) (Walter Clark, born 1944), American police detective and television writer and producer
 Walter Eli Clark (1869–1950), American politician, Governor of Alaska
 Walter Clark (judge) (1846–1924), North Carolina jurist
 Walter Van Tilburg Clark (1909–1971), American author of short stories, poetry and novels
 Walter Ernest Clark (1873–1955), president of the University of Nevada, father of Walter Van Tilburg Clark
 Walter Leighton Clark (1859–1935), American businessman, inventor and artist
 Walter Eugene Clark (1881–1960), American philologist
 Walter H. Clark (1902–1994), professor of psychology of religion at Andover Newton Theological School
 Walter Appleton Clark (1876–1906), artist and illustrator

See also
 Wally Clark (disambiguation)
 Walter Clarke (disambiguation)
 E. Walter Clark, Commodore